"Intense" is a composition by Dutch DJ and record producer Armin van Buuren featuring Israeli-American violinist Miri Ben-Ari. The track was released only in the Netherlands by Armada Music as a digital download on 22 November 2013 as the fourth single from van Buuren's fifth studio album Intense.

Introducing the album, the track combines van Buuren's trance music with Ben-Ari's violin sound. It was chosen as "tune of year 2013" by the listeners of Armin van Buuren's radio A State of Trance.

Track listing
 Digital download
 "Intense" (radio edit) – 2:53
"Intense" (Dannic remix) – 5:52
"Intense" (Andrew Rayel remix) – 6:59

Charts

References 

2013 singles
Armin van Buuren songs
2013 songs
Songs written by Armin van Buuren
Armada Music singles
Songs written by Benno de Goeij